Claire Chapotot (born 30 January 1990 in Gap, Hautes-Alpes) is a French snowboarder. She placed 13th in the women's snowboard cross event at the 2010 Winter Olympics.

References

1990 births
Living people
French female snowboarders
Olympic snowboarders of France
Snowboarders at the 2010 Winter Olympics
Universiade silver medalists for France
Universiade medalists in snowboarding
Competitors at the 2011 Winter Universiade
21st-century French women